Events in the year 2023 in Syria

Incumbents
 President: Bashar al-Assad
 Prime Minister: Hussein Arnous

Events 
For events related to the civil war, see Timeline of the Syrian civil war (2023)
 22 January – At least 13 people are killed when a five-story building collapses in Aleppo, due to a leaking of water in the building's foundation.
 6 February – 2023 Turkey–Syria earthquakes
 10 February - The death toll in the Turkey-Syria earthquakes has passed 23,000.

Deaths 

 6 February – Nader Joukhadar, 45, football player (Al-Wathba, national team) and manager (Salam Zgharta).

References 

 

 
Syria
Syria
2020s in Syria
Years of the 21st century in Syria